Atelodesmis knabi is a species of beetle in the family Cerambycidae. It was described by Fisher in 1925. It is known from Mexico.

References

Eupogonius
Beetles described in 1925